Karpfenteich is a lake in Pankow, Berlin, Germany.

Lakes of Berlin
Pankow
LKarpfenteich
Ponds of Germany